Euploea camaralzeman is an Indomalayan species of danaine butterfly.

The larva feeds on Strophanthus dichotomus.

Subspecies
E. c. camaralzeman (Burma, Thailand, Vietnam)
E. c. claudina Staudinger, 1889 (Palawan)
E. c. cratis Butler, 1866 (Philippines: Luzon, Babuyanes; Japan)
E. c. formosana Matsumura, 1919 (Taiwan, Japan)
E. c. hypanis Fruhstorfer, 1910 (Java, Lesser Sunda)
E. c. malayica (Butler, 1878) (Sumatra, Peninsular Malaya) - Langkawi Malayan crow
E. c. paraclaudina Pendlebury, 1939 (Peninsular Malaya)
E. c. scudderi (Butler, 1878) (Borneo)

References

External links
 images representing Euploea camaralzeman  at Consortium for the Barcode of Life

camaralzeman
Butterflies described in 1866
Butterflies of Asia
Taxa named by Arthur Gardiner Butler